Blastobasis albidella is a moth in the  family Blastobasidae. It was described by Hans Rebel in 1928. It is found in Morocco.

References

Natural History Museum Lepidoptera generic names catalog

Blastobasis
Moths described in 1928
Moths of Africa
Taxa named by Hans Rebel